Matthew W. Hervey (born May 16, 1966) is an American former professional ice hockey defenseman.

Hervey grew up in Whittier, California and played 35 games in the National Hockey League with the Winnipeg Jets, Boston Bruins, and Tampa Bay Lightning.

Career statistics

References

External links

1966 births
American men's ice hockey defensemen
Atlanta Knights players
Boston Bruins players
Detroit Falcons (CoHL) players
Lethbridge Broncos players
Langley Eagles players
Living people
Long Beach Ice Dogs (IHL) players
Maine Mariners players
Milwaukee Admirals (IHL) players
Moncton Hawks players
Richmond Sockeyes players
Sportspeople from Whittier, California
Seattle Thunderbirds players
Tampa Bay Lightning players
Undrafted National Hockey League players
Victoria Cougars (WHL) players
Winnipeg Jets (1979–1996) players
Ice hockey players from California